Colors of the Day: The Best of Judy Collins, (or simply Colors of the Day) is a compilation album by the American singer and songwriter Judy Collins, released by Elektra Records in 1972. 

(In the United Kingdom, it was released as Amazing Grace: THE BEST OF JUDY COLLINS, not to be confused with her 1985 UK album Amazing Grace.) 

The album peaked at No. 37 on the Billboard Pop Albums charts. It was produced by Mark Abramson of Elektra Records and contains 12 tracks, including her U.S. top-forty hit cover of Joni Mitchell's "Both Sides Now", her recording of "Amazing Grace", Sandy Denny's  "Who Knows Where the Time Goes", and Collins' own composition "Albatross" (the latter two recordings were included in the film adaptation of The Subject Was Roses).  Former United States president Bill Clinton has called the album an all-time favorite.

The album was certified Gold by the RIAA in 1974, for sales of over 500,000 copies. It was later certified Platinum in 1997, for sales of over 1,000,000 copies.

Track listing 
 "Someday Soon" (Ian Tyson) – 3:44
 "Since You Asked" (Judy Collins) – 2:33
 "Both Sides Now" (Joni Mitchell) – 3:14
 "Sons Of" (Eric Blau, Jacques Brel, Gerard Jouannest, Mort Shuman) – 2:26
 "Suzanne" (Leonard Cohen) – 4:24
 "Farewell to Tarwathie" (Traditional) – 5:31
 "Who Knows Where the Time Goes" (Sandy Denny) – 4:40
 "Sunny Goodge Street" (Donovan) – 2:56
 "My Father" (Judy Collins) – 5:02
 "Albatross" (Judy Collins) – 4:50
 "In My Life" (Lennon–McCartney) – 2:53
 "Amazing Grace" (Traditional) – 4:06

Personnel
 Judy Collins – vocals, guitar, piano, keyboards, liner notes
 Joshua Rifkin – arranger, conductor

Production notes
 Produced by Mark Abramson, David Anderle
 Mastered by Joe Gastwirt, Steve Hoffman, Andy Paley
 Engineered by John Haeny
 Photography by Bettey Beaird
 Jac Holzman – production supervisor

References

1972 greatest hits albums
Judy Collins compilation albums
Albums arranged by Joshua Rifkin
Albums produced by David Anderle
Albums produced by Mark Abramson
Elektra Records compilation albums